is a Japanese manga series written by Tsukasa Monma and illustrated by Shikako. It was serialized on Kodansha's Comic Days app from April 2020 to September 2021, when it was transferred to Weekly Young Magazine.

Publication
Written by Tsukasa Monma and illustrated by Shikako, Manshū Ahen Squad started on Kodansha's app Comic Days on April 9, 2020. Its latest exclusive chapter on the platform was published on September 9, 2021, and the series was transferred to Weekly Young Magazine on September 18 of the same year. Kodansha has collected its chapters into individual tankōbon volumes. The first volume was released on August 11, 2020. As of April 6, 2022, eight volumes have been released.

Volume list

References

External links
 
 

Crime in anime and manga
Historical anime and manga
Kodansha manga
Seinen manga
Suspense anime and manga
Works about opium